Yuzu (Citrus junos, from Japanese  or ) is a citrus fruit and plant in the family Rutaceae of East Asian origin. Yuzu has been cultivated mainly in East Asia, though recently also in  New Zealand, Australia, Spain, Italy, and France.

It is believed to have originated in central China as an F1 hybrid of the mangshanyeju subspecies of mandarin orange and the ichang papeda.

Description 
This fruit resembles a small grapefruit with uneven skin and can be either yellow or green depending on the degree of ripeness.

Yuzu forms an upright shrub or small tree, which commonly has many large thorns. Leaves are notable for a large, leaf-like petiole, resembling those of the related makrut lime and ichang papeda, and are heavily scented.

Yuzu closely resembles sudachi (Citrus sudachi, a Japanese citrus from Tokushima Prefecture, a yuzu–mandarin orange cross) in many regards, though, unlike the sudachi, yuzu eventually ripen to an orange colour and there are subtle differences between the flavors of the fruit.

Cultivation 
The yuzu originated and grew wild in central China and Tibet region. It was introduced to Japan and Korea during the Tang dynasty and is still cultivated there. It grows slowly, generally requiring ten years to fruit. To shorten the duration to fruiting, it may be grafted onto karatachi (P. trifoliata). It is unusual among citrus plants in being relatively frost-hardy, due to its cold-hardy Ichang papeda ancestry, and can be grown in regions with winters as low as  where more sensitive citrus would not thrive.

Varieties and similar fruits 
In Japan, an ornamental version of yuzu called  "flower yuzu" is also grown for its flowers rather than its fruit. A sweet variety of yuzu known as the yuko, only present in Japan, became severely endangered during the 1970s and 1980s; a major attempt has been made to revive this varietal in southern Japan. Another variety of yuzu in Japan, with knobby skin, is called .

Dangyuja, a Korean citrus fruit from Jeju Island, is often considered a type of yuzu due to its similar shape and flavor, but it is genetically a variety of pomelo.

Use

East Asia

Culinary use

Japan 

Yuzu's domestic production is about 27,000 tons (2016). Though rarely eaten as a fruit, yuzu is a common ingredient in Japanese cuisine, where the aromatic zest (outer rind) and the juice are used much in the same way that lemons are used in other cuisines. The yuzu's flavor is tart and fragrant, closely resembling that of the grapefruit, with overtones of mandarin orange.

It is an integral ingredient (along with sudachi, daidai, and other similar citrus fruits) in the citrus-based sauce ponzu, and yuzu vinegar is also produced. Yuzu is often combined with honey to make , a kind of syrup that is used to make yuzu tea, or as an ingredient in alcoholic drinks such as the yuzu sour.  (also , literally "yuzu and pepper") is a spicy Japanese sauce made from green or yellow yuzu zest, green or red chili peppers, and salt.

It is used to make liquor (such as) and wine.

Slivered yuzu rind is used to garnish a savory, salty egg-pudding dish called chawanmushi, as well as miso soup.

Yuzu is used to make various sweets, including marmalade and cake. It is used extensively in the flavoring of many snack products, such as Doritos.

Korea 

Yuja is also a common ingredient in Korean-style western food, such as salads.

Other uses

Yuzu baths

Yuzu is also known for its characteristically strong aroma, and the oil from its skin is marketed as a fragrance. In Japan, bathing with yuzu on Tōji, the winter solstice, is a custom that dates to at least the early 18th century. Whole yuzu fruits are floated in the hot water of the bath, sometimes enclosed in a cloth bag, releasing their aroma. The fruit may also be cut in half, allowing the citrus juice to mingle with the bathwater. The yuzu bath, known commonly as yuzu yu (柚子湯), but also as yuzu buro (柚子風呂), is said to guard against colds, treat the roughness of skin, warm the body, and relax the mind.

Use as wood
The body of the taepyeongso, a Korean traditional oboe, close to the Chinese Suona or the Zurna, is often made from jujube, mulberry, or yuzu wood.

Elsewhere 
Beginning in the early 21st century, yuzu has been increasingly used by chefs in the United States and other Western nations, achieving notice in a 2003 article in The New York Times.

In the United States, the Department of Agriculture has a ban on the import of fresh yuzu (alongside most citrus plants) from abroad, including both the fruit and the trees. This is intended to prevent the spread of contagious diseases amongst domestic crops.

See also 

 Calamansi
 Dangyuja

References

External links 
 
 
 

Citrus
Fruits originating in East Asia
Japanese fruit
Korean fruit